Macrogrammites is an extinct genus of cephalopod belonging to the ammonite subclass.

References

Jurassic ammonites
Schlotheimiidae
Ammonitida genera